David Baillie Graham (born 6 October 1978) is a Scottish footballer who last played for Sheffield F.C. His favoured position is as a forward, although he can also play in midfield. He has been capped at Under-21 level by his country.

Playing career
Born in Edinburgh, Scotland, Graham began his career with Rangers, making his debut in the 5–3 away win against Shelbourne in the UEFA Cup first qualifying round first leg. He made four further appearances, all as a substitute before moving to Dunfermline Athletic in November 1998. He joined Inverness Caledonian Thistle on loan in January 2001, before moving to Torquay United on loan in March that year. He settled in well at Torquay United, helping the Devon side retain their league status on the final day of the season in the crucial game at Barnet. In July that year he signed permanently for Torquay and played a major role in turning the club's fortunes around, culminating in automatic promotion at the end of the 2003–04 season.

Wigan Athletic 
Not surprisingly his form had been noticed by larger clubs than Torquay United and he moved to Wigan Athletic in June 2004 for a fee of £215,000. Despite helping Wigan to the Premier League, scoring once against Coventry City in the process, he moved to Sheffield Wednesday in August 2005 for a fee of £250,000.

Sheffield Wednesday 
A slow start to his career at Hillsborough led him to sign on loan at Huddersfield Town on 23 January 2006, until the end of the season. He scored nine goals in seventeen appearances for Huddersfield Town, helping them to ensure a play-off place in League One, if not quite automatic promotion.

Graham was blocked from Wednesday's 2006 tour of the United States, visa restrictions due to a minor police offence nine years previously preventing his entry to the country. Wednesday accepted an undisclosed bid for Graham from Blackpool on 27 July 2006, but he turned down the move, instead joining Bradford City on a five-month loan deal.

After returning from his unsuccessful spell at Bradford, Graham again found it hard to break into Wednesday's first team under Brian Laws not making a single starting appearance for the first team. Although he impressed, scoring freely in the reserves. On 21 March it was announced that Graham would be returning to the team bottom of the football league where he first made a name for himself, on a loan until the end of the season, at Torquay United. In a bid to preserve their Football League status and hopefully impress Brian Laws enough to warrant a place on the team sheet. It later became clear that Graham had been transfer listed, fined two weeks wages and sent to Torquay due to a 'serious breach of club discipline'. Graham was unable to prevent Torquay's relegation from the Football League.

He finished his Wednesday career with three goals in 26 appearances.

Gillingham 
At the end of the 2006–07 season Graham was told he had no future at the club and made available for transfer. He joined Gillingham on trial in July 2007. He was released by Sheffield Wednesday on 6 August 2007 and signed for Gillingham on a one-year contract the following day. He made his debut for Gillingham on 11 August 2007 against Cheltenham Town, as his side went down 1–0. He scored his first goals for the club on 2 October when he scored two in a 3–1 defeat of Leyton Orient. On 31 January, it was announced that he had been released from his contract.

Lincoln City 
On 27 June 2008, Graham agreed to join former manager Peter Jackson at Lincoln City on a six-month deal. He made his debut against Rotherham United in a 1–0 defeat, and played ten games, eight as substitute, but failed to score during his six months. 
 Lincoln City released him when his six-month contract came to an end.

Non-League 

In March 2009 he signed for Sheffield of the Northern Premier League and then moved on to Conference North outfit Ilkeston Town. Following the winding-up of Ilkeston Town, Graham rejoined Sheffield F.C. debuting in the 2–0 Northern Premier League Division One South away defeat to Carlton Town on 18 September 2010.

In late October 2010 he moved to Worksop Town. At the start of the 2011–12 season, Graham signed for a third spell at Sheffield F.C.

Honours
Individual
PFA Team of the Year: 2003–04 Third Division

References

External links

1978 births
Living people
Footballers from Edinburgh
Scottish footballers
Scotland under-21 international footballers
Rangers F.C. players
Inverness Caledonian Thistle F.C. players
Wigan Athletic F.C. players
Sheffield Wednesday F.C. players
Torquay United F.C. players
Dunfermline Athletic F.C. players
Huddersfield Town A.F.C. players
Bradford City A.F.C. players
Gillingham F.C. players
Lincoln City F.C. players
Sheffield F.C. players
Ilkeston Town F.C. (1945) players
Scottish Premier League players
Scottish Football League players
English Football League players
Hucknall Town F.C. players
Northern Premier League players
Association football forwards